Guam competed in the Summer Olympic Games for the first time at the 1988 Summer Olympics in Seoul, South Korea.  The Guam National Olympic Committee was formed in 1976 and recognized by the IOC (International Olympic Committee) in 1986.

Competitors
The following is the list of number of competitors in the Games.

Results by event

Athletics
Men's Marathon 
 Fred Schumann — 2"49.52 (→ 86th place)
 James Walker — 2"56.32 (→ 90th place)
 Ricardo Taitano — 3"03.19 (→ 94th place)

Women's Marathon 
 Julie Ogborn — 3"10.31 (→ 59th place)
 Lourdes Klitzkie — 3"25.32 (→ 63rd place)
 Mariana Ysrael — 3"42.23 (→ 64th place)

Swimming
Men's 100m Freestyle
 Jonathan Sakovich
 Heat – 54.24 (→ did not advance, 53rd place)

Men's 200m Freestyle
 Jonathan Sakovich
 Heat – 1:57.72 (→ did not advance, 49th place)

Men's 400m Freestyle
 Jonathan Sakovich
 Heat – 4:06.89 (→ did not advance, 41st place)

Men's 1500m Freestyle
 Jonathan Sakovich
 Heat – 16:26.77 (→ did not advance, 35th place)

Men's 100m Backstroke
 Patrick Sagisi
 Heat – 1:01.86 (→ did not advance, 41st place)

Men's 200m Backstroke
 Patrick Sagisi
 Heat – 2:15.82 (→ did not advance, 36th place)

Men's 200m Individual Medley
 Jonathan Sakovich
 Heat – 2:16.70 (→ did not advance, 45th place)

Men's 400m Individual Medley
 Jonathan Sakovich
 Heat – 4:44.78 (→ did not advance, 29th place out of 34)

Women's 50m Freestyle
 Veronica Cummings
 Heat – 28.94 (→ did not advance, 43rd place)

Women's 100m Freestyle
 Veronica Cummings
 Heat – 1:02.63 (→ did not advance, 50th place)

Women's 100m Butterfly
 Barbara Gayle
 Heat – 1:12.84 (→ did not advance, 40th place)

Wrestling

 Reuben Tucker, 90KGs

References

Official Report of the Organizing Committee for the Games of the XXIVth Olympiad Seoul 1988, Volume 2 – Competition Summary and Results

Nations at the 1988 Summer Olympics
1988
Olympic